"I'm the Man" is a song by American hip hop recording artist 50 Cent, released on December 4, 2015 as the third single from his eleventh mixtape, The Kanan Tape (2015). The hip hop song features vocals and production from Sonny Digital. It was released for digital download on February 12, 2016.

Music video 
On January 1, 2016, 50 Cent uploaded the music video for "I'm the Man" on his YouTube account.

Track listing 
Download digital
I'm the Man (featuring Sonny Digital) — 3:55

Remix

The official remix features vocals from recording artist Chris Brown and produced by Sonny Digital. It was released for digital download on May 6, 2016 as the single, with the record label G-Unit Records.

Track listing 
Download digital
I'm the Man (Remix) (featuring Chris Brown) – 3:55

Music video 
The music video for the remix version premiered on May 6, 2016, on his YouTube and Vevo account. It was directed by Eif Rivera. The end of the video features the preview from music video "No Romeo No Juliet" As of July 25, 2017, the video has amassed over 120 million views.

Charts

Weekly charts

Original version

Remix version

Certifications and sales

References

External links

2016 singles
2015 songs
50 Cent songs
Chris Brown songs
Songs written by 50 Cent
Songs written by Chris Brown
Capitol Records singles
G-Unit Records singles